Vasile Balan (born 7 February 1992) is a Romanian rugby union player. He plays as a prop for professional SuperLiga club Steaua București.

Club career
Vasile Bălan started playing rugby as a youth for a school based local Romanian club, CSS Bârlad, in his native city of Bârlad. A logical move to the local club RC Bârlad followed. His professional debut came in 2016 for Politehnica Iași. After just one season with Politehnica he moved to Bucharest-based side, CSM where he played for two seasons. In 2019 he was signed by Steaua following the dissolution of his former club, CSM.

International career
Bălan is also selected for Romania's national team, the Oaks, making his international debut during the Week 5 of 2019 Rugby Europe Championship in a match against the Zwarte Duivels / Diables Noirs on 17 March 2019.

References

External links

1992 births
Living people
Sportspeople from Bârlad
Romanian rugby union players
Romania international rugby union players
CS Politehnica Iași (rugby union) players
CSM București (rugby union) players
CSA Steaua București (rugby union) players
Rugby union props